An occulting disk is a small disk used in a telescope to block the view of a bright object in order to allow observation of a fainter one. The coronagraph, at its simplest, is an occulting disk in the focal plane of a telescope, or in front of the entrance aperture, that blocks out the image of the solar disk, so that the corona can be seen. Starshade is one designed to fly in formation with a space telescope to image exoplanets.

See also
 New Worlds Mission
 Space sunshade
 Telescope for Habitable Exoplanets and Interstellar/Intergalactic Astronomy

References

Optical telescope components
Optical devices
Star images
Stellar astronomy